Egypt-Japan University of Science and Technology (E-JUST,  Al-Gāmi`ah al-Miṣriyyah al-Yabāniyyah lil-`Ulūm wal-Tiknūlūjiyā,  Ejiputo Nihon Kagaku Gijutsu Daigaku) is an Egyptian research university with a Japanese partnership, established by Presidential Decree No. 149 of 2009 as a university based on scientific research and diversified education. It is one of the leading research universities in Egypt and the Middle East. According to the 2021 Times Higher Education (THE) Arab University Rankings, E-JUST was ranked as the 2nd best university in Egypt and the 11th best university in the Middle East and North Africa region. 

By strengthening ties and cooperation between Egyptian and Japanese academic institutions, as well as industrial companies, E-JUST  conducts state-of-the-art research with the application of Japanese educational standards, policies and systems, and uses the latest Japanese technologies and systems in its teaching and research.

The Egypt-Japan University of Science and Technology (E-JUST) is located in New Borg El Arab city in Alexandria Governorate. The city was chosen as one of the major industrial areas in Egypt, which contains five diverse industrial zones, has more than 1,300 industrial and production facilities, and attracts a large number of international investments; The temporary headquarters of the university and the university housing are currently located in the third district of New Borg El Arab city until it is moved to its new headquarters in the universities area on an area of 200 acres, once all the construction, laboratories and infrastructure of the university, which is estimated at a cost of about 3.75 billion Egyptian pounds, was inaugurated. The first phase of it is in September 2020.

History
 In March 2009, the bilateral agreement to establish the university was signed between the governments of Egypt and Japan.
 In May 2009, Presidential Decree No. 149 was issued to establish the university.
 In July 2009, an international architectural competition was organized between the Egyptian and Japanese sides to choose the architectural design for the permanent headquarters of the university, in which more than 75 architectural companies participated.
 In December 2009, the winners of the competition were announced. They are the first prize of $100,000 for Arata Isozaki & Co., the second prize of $60,000 for Hiroshi Hara and Associates, and the third prize of $40,000 for Sou Fujimoto Architects.
 In February 2010, started studying at the temporary headquarters of the university, majoring in engineering.
 In February 2011 started studying International Business and Human Studies major.
 In May 2016, a protocol for the establishment of the first phase of the permanent university campus was signed, amounting to 1.25 billion pounds.
 In August 2017, a protocol for the establishment of the second phase of the permanent university campus was signed, amounting to 3.75 billion pounds.
 In September 2020, the first phase of the permanent university campus was opened and became functional.

Objectives

The Egyptian-Japanese University was established to achieve several objectives, the most important of which are:
 Establishing a new model for a pioneering Egyptian university based on the effective partnership between Egypt and Japan.
 Follow the Japanese model of innovative education based on scientific research, practical application and problem-solving methodology.
 To be a first-class research university according to international standards (40% of its students are from graduate studies and advanced research)
 It contains several Centers of Excellence based on the elements of innovation and creativity and embodying the new model of universities in the twenty-first century.
 The methods of competition with the world's major universities are based on advanced education and scientific research.
 It is unique in academic disciplines that interact with all production and service sectors and is interested in scientific fields with complex specializations and depends on the extensive use of communication technology and information systems.
 It aims to serve human development in Egypt, the Arab region and Africa.
 It aims to attract Japanese companies and organizations to cooperate with them in research and to use the capabilities of these companies in training and transfer of new technologies and advanced work methods to Egypt.

Rankings

Faculties 
The university has 14 colleges Faculty:

* Faculty of Engineering:
The Faculty consists of the following programs:
School of Electronics, Communications and Computer Engineering (ECCE):
Electrical Power Engineering Program.
Electronics & Communications Engineering Program.
Computer Science & Engineering Program.
Biomedical & Bioinformatics Engineering Program.
School of Innovative Design Engineering (IDE):
Industrial & Manufacturing Engineering Program.
Mechatronics Engineering Program.
Materials Science & Engineering Program.
School of Energy, Environment, Chemicals and Petrochemicals Engineering (EECE):
Chemicals and Petrochemicals Engineering Program.
Energy Resources Engineering Program.
Environmental Engineering Program.

* Faculty of Basic and Applied Sciences.

* Faculty of International Business and Humanities.

* Faculty of Pharmacy.

'''* Faculty of computer science and information technology.

Photo gallery

See also
 Japanese people in Egypt.
 Borg El Arab Technological University.
 City of Scientific Research and Technological Applications.

References

External links
 Official Website

Universities in Egypt
Educational institutions established in 2010
2010 establishments in Egypt
Egypt–Japan relations
New Borg El Arab